Jardine is a surname.

Jardine may also refer to:

 Jardine, Montana, United States
 Jardine, Queensland, Australia
 Jardine baronets, four baronetcies
 Jardine Matheson, or Jardines, a British multinational conglomerate
 Jardine Peak, Antarctica
 Jardine River, a river in Cape York, Queensland, Australia
 Jardine River, Queensland, a locality on Cape York, Queensland, Australia
 Clan Jardine

See also
 Jardines (disambiguation)
 
 Jardin (disambiguation)